Sino-Japanese War most often refers to:

 The First Sino-Japanese War (1894–1895), between China (Qing Dynasty) and Japan (Empire of Japan), primarily over control of Korea
 The Second Sino-Japanese War (1937–1945), began between China (Republic of China) and Japan (Empire of Japan) in 1937, eventually becoming part of World War II in 1941 when China joined the Allies. (China officially declared war against Japan in December 1941.)

Other wars involving China and Japan were:

 Goguryeo–Wa War
 Goguryeo–Tang War (645–668), was fought between Goguryeo and the Tang dynasty. During the course of the war, the two sides allied with various other states.
 Battle of Baekgang (663), a battle between Baekje restoration forces and their ally, Yamato Japan, against the allied forces of Silla and the Tang Dynasty of ancient China
 Mongol invasions of Japan in 1274 and 1281: a coalition of Mongol, Chinese and Korean troops under the Yuan dynasty unsuccessfully invaded Kamakura Japan
 Ningbo Incident (1523)
 Jiajing wokou raids (1547–1567), by Chinese-led international merchant-pirates (including the Japanese) on Ming dynasty China
 Japanese invasions of Korea (1592–98), was a full-scale war between a Ming dynasty and Joseon coalition and the invading Japanese
 Japanese invasion of Taiwan (1616), Japanese attempted conquest in Taiwan
 Japanese invasion of Taiwan (1874), Japanese punitive expedition against the Paiwan people
 Japanese invasion of Taiwan (1895) of the ex-Qing, Chinese-inhabited Republic of Formosa
 Boxer Rebellion (1898–1901), where Japan was part of the Eight-Nation Alliance that invaded Qing dynasty China to crush the Boxers
 Jinan incident (1928), between Japanese-backed warlords and the Kuomintang
 Japanese invasion of Manchuria, in 1931
 Pacification of Manchukuo, from 1931 to 1942
 January 28 Incident (1932), between the Republic of China and the Empire of Japan in, and around, Shanghai
 Defense of the Great Wall (1933), of Rehe (province) and subsequent Actions in Inner Mongolia (1933–1936)
 Burma Campaign, of World War II from 1942 to 1945, where the Chinese fought the Japanese Burma Army on the north wing of the campaign, in aid of British Empire forces